Monomorium subopacum, is a species of ant of the subfamily Myrmicinae. It is found in many Asian countries.

Subspecies
Monomorium subopacum planidorsum Emery, 1915 - Tunisia
Monomorium subopacum subopacum Smith, F., 1858 - Cape Verde, Niger, Senegal, United Arab Emirates, Madagascar, Sri Lanka, Canary Islands, Georgia, Gibraltar, Greece, Iberian Peninsula, Italy, Lebanon, Malta, Oman, Portugal, Spain, Tunisia.

References

External links

 at antwiki.org
Animaldiversity.org
It is.org

subopacum
Hymenoptera of Asia